Pizza My Heart is a chain of pizzeria restaurants in the San Francisco Bay Area.  The chain was founded in 1981 in Capitola, California, by Fred Poulos and Keith Holtaway. In 1997, the chain merged with Pizza-a-Go-Go, which was based in San Jose, California. The new locations inherited the Pizza My Heart name.  It is now owned by Chuck Hammers. The chain currently has twenty-five locations.

There are restaurants currently in Aptos, Blossom Hill, Burlingame, Capitola (2), Cupertino, Evergreen, Los Gatos, Monterey, Mountain View, Oakland, Palo Alto, Redwood City, San Jose (2), San Mateo, San Ramon, Santa Clara (3), Santa Cruz, Saratoga, Sunnyvale, Walnut Creek and Willow Glen.

Theme 
The original theme for Pizza My Heart was that of an urban East Coast pizzeria, a concept relatively rare in California at the time of its creation. The original image was cast by a series of eclectic street photos taken by Fred and originally published in the Santa Cruz entertainment weekly "Good Times" immediately after the first store opened on May 19, 1981. Shortly thereafter the duo was approached by up and coming cartoonist "Awest" who proposed rendering some of Fred's characters as cartoons and creating what amounted to a running comic strip as an advertising vehicle. The campaign proved hugely successful and led to the founding of the original Santa Cruz store at the old Transit Center in the downtown area.

The theme of the current Pizza My Heart is a retro surfer look, inspired by the original locations in Capitola and Santa Cruz.  The walls are decorated with framed antique photos from the 1930s to the 1970s, vintage surfboards and memorabilia. At times, the restaurant also plays old surf songs and videos from the 1960s, including hits from the Beach Boys.

A long-running TV campaign featured pro surfer Wingnut (Robert "Wingnut" Weaver), cast as a character named Jimmy.

Promotional Shirts - A promotional offer is to get a branded t-shirt and slice of pizza for $7.   Over 1 million shirts have been sold on this offer.

Menu 

The restaurant sells pizza by the slice or entire pies. Most locations offer gluten-free crusts or vegan whole pies. They also serve salads, breadsticks, chicken wings, and drinks.

References

External links 
 

Pizza chains of the United States
Regional restaurant chains in the United States
1981 establishments in California
Restaurants established in 1981
Companies based in Santa Clara County, California